Susan Pamela Jenner (born 26 March 1960) is a British former competition swimmer.

Swimming career
Jenner won a bronze medal in the 200-metre butterfly at the 1977 European Aquatics Championships.  She also competed in the 4×100-metre medley relay and 100-metre butterfly at the 1976 Summer Olympics in Montreal, and finished sixth in the latter event.

She represented England in the butterfly events and won a bronze medal in the 4 x 100 metres medley relay, at the 1978 Commonwealth Games in Edmonton, Alberta, Canada. She also won the 1978 ASA National Championship title in the 100 metres butterfly and the 1977 and 1978 200 metres butterfly titles.

References

External links

1960 births
Living people
European Aquatics Championships medalists in swimming
Olympic swimmers of Great Britain
Swimmers at the 1976 Summer Olympics
Swimmers at the 1978 Commonwealth Games
Commonwealth Games medallists in swimming
Commonwealth Games bronze medallists for England
Medallists at the 1978 Commonwealth Games